Teddy Trucks is a British children's cartoon television programme which was based on the best-selling books by award-winning author and illustrator, Michelle Cartlidge. The series was developed in conjunction with BBC Children's Television. The show follows a business company of bears who drive trucks and deliver cargo.

Characters
 Boss Bear: The coordinator of the Teddy Trucks company. Wears a checkered shirt, a red necktie and blue jeans.
 Mrs. Boss Bear: Boss' wife, who usually talks to him on the telephone. She wears a flowery blue dress, pearl necklace and blue flowered hat.
 Dusty: The Boss' secretary who has to constantly remind him to use the other phone. Wears a yellow flowered dress with blue rims.
 Bella: The driver of the first truck Wears a red head scarf, a pink shirt and red flowered overalls.
 Wilson: The driver of the second truck. Wears a pink shirt with yellow rims and checkered trousers.
 Jacko: The driver of the third truck. Wears a lilac shirt with pink rims and grey trousers.
 Gerry: The driver of the fourth truck. Wears a blue shirt with red rims and a brown striped trousers. Takes his mischievous dog Nutley wherever he goes.
 Rosie: The owner of the cafe, providing for the drivers during their break time. Wears a pink spotted dress and a yellow apron.
 'Governor Bear Boss Bear's father

Episodes

Broadcasting
The series was first transmitted on the BBC in 1994 as part of their children's programming lineup Children's BBC and aired from 4 January to 7 April of the same year. It was later sold to various global markets and aired on several networks in different countries including ABC TV in Australia from 15 July 1994 to 12 February 1999 and later on cable television on the Australian Fox Kids network and SABC 2 with an Afrikaans dubbed language and later with the original English dubbed language on e.tv in South Africa.Teddy Trucks was also broadcast on satellite television on Sky One (with the series being shown on their long running children's wrapper programme The DJ Kat Show which plays many cartoons from overseas as well as some UK ones such as Fireman Sam, Postman Pat and Count Duckula'') and later on TCC.

References

External links

1990s British children's television series
1994 British television series debuts
1994 British television series endings
BBC children's television shows
British children's animated adventure television series
English-language television shows
Animated television series about bears
1990s British animated television series